Stomaž is a small village in the Municipality of Sežana in the Littoral region of Slovenia.

The local church, built slightly outside the village, is dedicated to Saint Thomas and belongs to the Parish of Vrabče.

References

External links

Stomaž on Geopedia

Populated places in the Municipality of Sežana